In universal algebra and mathematical logic, a term algebra is a freely generated algebraic structure over a given signature. For example, in a signature consisting of a single binary operation, the term algebra over a set X of variables is exactly the free magma generated by X. Other synonyms for the notion include absolutely free algebra and anarchic algebra.

From a category theory perspective, a term algebra is the initial object for the category of all X-generated algebras of the same signature, and this object, unique up to isomorphism, is called an initial algebra; it generates by homomorphic projection all algebras in the category.

A similar notion is that of a Herbrand universe in logic, usually used under this name in logic programming, which is (absolutely freely) defined starting from the set of constants and function symbols in a set of clauses. That is, the Herbrand universe consists of all ground terms: terms that have no variables in them.

An atomic formula or atom is commonly defined as a predicate applied to a tuple of terms; a ground atom is then a predicate in which only ground terms appear. The Herbrand base is the set of all ground atoms that can be formed from predicate symbols in the original set of clauses and terms in its Herbrand universe. These two concepts are named after Jacques Herbrand.

Term algebras also play a role in the semantics of abstract data types, where an abstract data type declaration provides the signature of a multi-sorted algebraic structure and the term algebra is a concrete model of the abstract declaration.

Universal algebra
A type  is a set of function symbols, with each having an associated arity (i.e. number of inputs). A constant is a function symbol of arity 0.

Let  be a type, and let  be a non-empty set of symbols, representing the variable symbols. Formally,  is the smallest set such that:
 For all  and for all function symbols  and terms , we have the string    — given  terms , the application of an -ary function symbol  to them represents again a term.

Formally,  is defined as follows:

A term algebra is called absolutely free because for any algebra  of type , and for any function ,  extends to a unique homomorphism , which simply evaluates each term  to its corresponding value . Formally, for each :
 If , then .
 If , then .

Example

We use  to flag its members, which otherwise may be hard to recognize due to their uncommon syntactic form.
We have e.g. 
 , since  is a variable symbol; 
 , since  is a constant symbol; hence
 , since  is a 2-ary function symbol; hence, in turn, 
  since  is a 2-ary function symbol.
More generally, each string in  corresponds to a mathematical expression built from the admitted symbols and written in Polish prefix notation;
for example, the term  corresponds to the expression  in usual infix notation. No parentheses are needed to avoid ambiguities in Polish notation; e.g. the infix expression  corresponds to the term .

To give some counter-examples, we have e.g.
 , since  is neither an admitted variable symbol nor an admitted constant symbol;
 , for the same reason,
 , since  is a 2-ary function symbol, but is used here with only one argument term (viz. ).

This algebra uses  as its domain, on which addition and multiplication need to be defined.
For example,  evaluates to the term  .

For example, 

In a similar way, one obtains .

Herbrand base

The signature σ of a language is a triple <O, F, P> consisting of the alphabet of constants O, function symbols F, and predicates P. The Herbrand base of a signature σ consists of all ground atoms of σ: of all formulas of the form R(t1, ..., tn), where t1, ..., tn are terms containing no variables (i.e. elements of the Herbrand universe) and R is an n-ary relation symbol (i.e. predicate). In the case of logic with equality, it also contains all equations of the form t1 = t2, where t1 and t2 contain no variables.

Decidability

Term algebras can be shown decidable using quantifier elimination. The complexity of the decision problem is in NONELEMENTARY because binary constructors are injective and thus pairing functions.

See also
 Answer-set programming
 Clone (algebra)
 Domain of discourse / Universe (mathematics)
 Rabin's tree theorem (the monadic theory of the infinite complete binary tree is decidable)
 Initial algebra
 Abstract data type
 Term rewriting system

References

Further reading
 Joel Berman (2005). "The structure of free algebras". In Structural Theory of Automata, Semigroups, and Universal Algebra. Springer. pp. 47–76. .

External links
 

Universal algebra
Mathematical logic
Free algebraic structures
Unification (computer science)